Lost Where I Belong is the first studio album by British singer-songwriter Andreya Triana. It was released on Ninja Tune in 2010.

Critical reception
Rick Anderson of AllMusic gave the album 4 stars out of 5, describing it as "a debut album of impressive beauty and maturity, one that documents a long musical and personal voyage fraught with heartbreak, but never succumbs to self-indulgent sentiment or confessional mawkishness." Euan Ferguson of The Skinny called it "a deeply soulful and promising debut."

Charles Aaron of Spin listed it as the best album of 2010.

Track listing

Personnel
Credits adapted from liner notes.

 Andreya Triana – vocals, percussion
 Simon Green – instruments
 Mikey Simmonds – strings
 Hannah Miller – cello
 Mike Lesirge – horns, flute
 Alan Hardiman – horns
 Ryan Jacob – horns
 Fin Greenall – guitar
 Jack Baker – drums

Charts

References

External links
 

2010 debut albums
Andreya Triana albums
Ninja Tune albums